A navy is a maritime fleet.

Navy may also refer to:

Maritime forces

Commercial fleet
Merchant navy, a commercial maritime fleet

Fighting forces
 Argentine Navy
 Chilean Navy
 Chinese Navy (disambiguation)
 Croatian Navy
 French Navy
 German Navy
 Hellenic Navy
 Israeli Navy
 Marina Militare (Modern Italian Navy)
 North Korean Navy
 Peruvian Navy
 Portuguese Navy
 Regia Marina (Italian Navy until 1946)
 Royal Australian Navy
 Royal Canadian Navy
 Royal Navy (United Kingdom Navy)
 Royal Netherlands Navy
 Russian Navy
 South Korean Navy
 Spanish Navy
 Taiwan Navy
 Turkish Navy
 Ukrainian Navy
 United States Navy

Arts, entertainment, and media
The Navy (London), published by the Navy League of Great Britain
The Navy (Washington), published by the United States Navy
The Navy (film), a 1930 film

Other uses
 Navy blue, a color
 Indigo
 Navy Midshipmen, the intercollegiate athletic program of the U.S. Naval Academy
 Navy Pier, a large pier in Chicago
 United States Naval Academy, in intercollegiate athletics and academics
 Navy (perfume)
 Navy (given name)

See also
 Naval (disambiguation)
 Navi (disambiguation)
 Navvy